Nashua may refer to:

 Nashaway people, Native American tribe living in 17th-century New England

Places

In Australia:
 Nashua, New South Wales

In the United States:
 Nashua, California
 Nashua, Iowa
 Nashua, Minnesota
 Nashua, Kansas City, Missouri
 Nashua, Montana
 Nashua, New Hampshire, the largest city with this name
 The Nashua River in New Hampshire and Massachusetts

Other uses

 The Nashua Corporation, American company based in Nashua, New Hampshire
 Nashua (horse), Thoroughbred racehorse and 1955 Horse of the Year
 Nashua Dolphins, South African cricket team
 Nashua (YTB-774), United States Navy harbor tug

See also
Nashua High School (disambiguation)
Nasua
Nassau (disambiguation)